Brunna is a locality and a suburb of Metropolitan Stockholm situated in Upplands-Bro Municipality, Stockholm County, Sweden with 3,925 inhabitants in 2010.

References 

Populated places in Upplands-Bro Municipality
Metropolitan Stockholm